The Notch Peak Formation is a geologic formation in Utah. It preserves fossils dating back to the Cambrian period.

The Notch Peak Formation has three recognized members:  Hellnmaria, Red Tops, and Lava Dam Members (in ascending order), all of which are composed of limestone and dolomite.  It is named after the prominent peak of the same name in the House Range of Utah's West Desert, which is its type locality.

See also

 List of fossiliferous stratigraphic units in Utah
 Paleontology in Utah

References
Citations

Bibliography
 

Cambrian geology of Utah
Cambrian southern paleotropical deposits